Frederick Savage may refer to:
 Frederick Savage (schoolmaster), British schoolmaster who founded Seaford College
 Frederick Savage (engineer), English engineer and inventor
 Frederick Lincoln Savage, American architect
 Fred Savage (Frederick Aaron Savage), American actor and television director